Maine School Administrative District 54 (MSAD 54) is an operating school district within Somerset County, Maine, covering the towns of Skowhegan, Canaan, Mercer, Smithfield, Cornville, and Norridgewock.

Schools 
MSAD 54 oversees 5 elementary schools, one middle school, and one high school, as well as a career and technical center and Adult Education center.

Elementary schools 

 Bloomfield Elementary School

 Canaan Elementary School

 Margaret Chase Smith School

 Mill Stream Elementary School

 North Elementary School

Middle schools 

 Skowhegan Area Middle School

High schools 

 Skowhegan Area High School

References 

54
54